Canfield-Morgan House, is located in Cedar Grove, Essex County, New Jersey, United States. The building was built in 1845 and was added to the National Register of Historic Places on November 7, 1995.

See also
National Register of Historic Places listings in Essex County, New Jersey

References

Houses on the National Register of Historic Places in New Jersey
Georgian architecture in New Jersey
Houses completed in 1845
Houses in Essex County, New Jersey
National Register of Historic Places in Essex County, New Jersey
New Jersey Register of Historic Places